DXAP (103.9 FM), broadcasting as Radyo Trumpeta 103.9, is a radio station owned and operated by Image Broadcasting Corporation, a company owned by Norbert B. Pagaspas. The station's studio is located along J. C. Aquino Ave., Butuan.

References

Radio stations in Butuan
Radio stations established in 1988